Stump Pond refer to:
 Stump Pond (Pembroke, Massachusetts)
 Northern portion of Balch Pond